Janos Delacruz (born November 5, 1985) is a Filipino painter, illustrator, etcher, and printmaker. He is noted for his surreal and dreamlike paintings, illustrations and prints. His style and unique approach in his artworks which shows intricate details and variety of colors is what captures the viewer's attention.

Early life
Janos Delacruz was from, and currently lives in, Muntinlupa, Philippines. He is the son of Fil Delacruz, a National Artist Awards nominee for Visual Arts. He finished his college education at the University of Santo Tomas where he majored in Advertising Arts.

Education

Awards and achievements

Exhibitions

One-man exhibitions

Group exhibitions

See also
 Fil Delacruz

References

External links
 Official website

Living people
1985 births
Filipino painters
People from Muntinlupa
Artists from Metro Manila
University of Santo Tomas alumni
Filipino printmakers